Cliffhanger (1993–2001) was a Dutch progressive rock band.

Biography 
The band was founded in 1993 by keyboard player Dick Heijboer. Right from the start the band decided to play music in the tradition of old school Genesis, Yes, King Crimson, Van Der Graaf Generator and Emerson, Lake & Palmer. Important was the use of “vintage instruments” such as Moog Taurus Bass Pedals, Hammond organ, Moog synthesizers and Rickenbacker bass guitar.

In 1995 their debut album Cold Steel saw the light, one year later followed by their second album Not to Be or Not to Be which had a more concept like approach. After the 3rd album “Mirror Site” the band split up for 1.5 year. During that period “Hope and Despair” was released which contained live recordings of songs which didn't appear on previous albums.

In 1999 the band was re-founded. The next year, the final album Circle was released. Due to musical differences the band decided to split up again. Dick Heijboer decided to move on with a solo project called “NovoX” with all Cliffhanger members, including newcomer Mark Vermeule. An album called NovoX was released in 2004. Bass player Gijs Koopman and Guitarist/vocalist Rinie Huigen appeared later in Knight Area.

In 2011, founder member Dick Heijboer worked on an audio DVD Dug Out Alive which contains all demo's, various live concerts and out-takes from the period 1993–2001.

During 2013, their debut album Cold Steel was re-issued with bonus tracks on the Dutch Label Freia Music.

Discography

Members 
Rinie Huigen – Vocals/Guitars
Dick Heijboer – Keyboards
Gijs Koopman – Bass/Moog Taurus bass pedals
Hans Boonk – Drums

External links 
Official Cliffhanger website (archived)
Prog Archives Cliffhanger
Prog Archives Novox

References 

Dutch rock music groups